The 2018 Pampanga Lanterns season is the 1st season of the franchise in the Maharlika Pilipinas Basketball League (MPBL).

Key dates
 June 12, 2018: Regular Season Begins.

Current roster

Datu Cup

Standings

Game log

|- style="background:#fcc;"
| 1
| June 14
| San Juan
| L 70–93
| Allen Enriquez (20)
| Allen Enriquez (6)
| Gomez, Salonga (2)
| Angeles University Foundation Gymnasium
| 0–1
|- style="background:#;"
| 2
| 
| 
| 
| 
| 
| 
|
| 
|- style="background:#;"
| 3
| 
| 
| 
| 
|
| 
| 
| 
|- style="background:#;"
| 4
| 
| 
| 
| 
|
| 
| 
| 
|- style="background:#;"
| 5
| 
| 
| 
| 
|
| 
| 
| 
|- style="background:#;"
| 6
| 
| 
| 
| 
|
| 
| 
| 
|- style="background:#;"
| 7
| 
| 
| 
| 
|
| 
| 
| 
|- style="background:#;"
| 8
| 
| 
| 
| 
|
| 
| 
| 
|- style="background:#;"
| 9
| 
| 
| 
| 
|
| 
| 
| 
|- style="background:#;"
| 10
| 
| 
| 
| 
|
| 
| 
| 
|- style="background:#;"
| 11
| 
| 
| 
| 
|
| 
| 
| 
|- style="background:#;"
| 12
| 
| 
| 
| 
|
| 
| 
| 
|- style="background:#;"
| 13
| 
| 
| 
| 
|
| 
| 
| 
|- style="background:#;"
| 14
| 
| 
| 
| 
|
| 
| 
| 
|- style="background:#;"
| 15
| 
| 
| 
| 
|
| 
| 
| 
|- style="background:#;"
| 16
| 
| 
| 
| 
|
| 
| 
| 
|- style="background:#;"
| 17
| 
| 
| 
| 
|
| 
| 
| 
|- style="background:#;"
| 18
| 
| 
| 
| 
|
| 
| 
| 
|- style="background:#;"
| 19
| 
| 
| 
| 
|
| 
| 
| 
|- style="background:#;"
| 20
| 
| 
| 
| 
|
| 
| 
| 
|- style="background:#;"
| 21
| 
| 
| 
| 
|
| 
| 
| 
|- style="background:#;"
| 22
| 
| 
| 
| 
|
| 
| 
| 
|- style="background:#;"
| 23
| 
| 
| 
| 
|
| 
| 
| 
|- style="background:#;"
| 24
| 
| 
| 
| 
|
| 
| 
| 
|- style="background:#;"
| 25
| 
| 
| 
| 
|
| 
| 
|

References

Pampanga Lanterns Season, 2018